is a Japanese footballer who plays for Daejeon Hana Citizen as a midfielder.

He prefers to play as a central attacking midfielder, but he can also play as a left winger or a second striker.

Playing career
Masatoshi Ishida joined to J2 League club; Kyoto Sanga FC in 2014. He moved to J3 League club; SC Sagamihara in July 2016.

Club statistics
As of 23 February 2018.

References

External links

Profile at Thespakusatsu Gunma
Profile at Azul Claro Numazu
 

1995 births
Living people
Association football people from Chiba Prefecture
Japanese footballers
Japanese expatriate footballers
J2 League players
J3 League players
K League 2 players
K League 1 players
Kyoto Sanga FC players
SC Sagamihara players
Thespakusatsu Gunma players
J.League U-22 Selection players
Azul Claro Numazu players
Ansan Greeners FC players
Suwon FC players
Gangwon FC players
Daejeon Hana Citizen FC players
Association football forwards
Japanese expatriate sportspeople in South Korea
Expatriate footballers in South Korea